The Scottish National League Division Two (known as Tennent's National League Division 2 for sponsorship reasons) is the third tier of the Scottish League Championship for amateur rugby union clubs in Scotland.

The division was established in its current format in 2014 after the creation of three national leagues below the Premiership. This replaced the two Championship Leagues which were scrapped after just two seasons.

History

Promotion and Relegation
The top two teams are promoted to Scottish National League Division One and the bottom two teams relegated to Scottish National League Division Three.

Promoted from 2018 to 2019 Scottish National League Division Three
Gordonians RFC (1st)
Newton Stewart RFC (2nd)

Relegated from 2018 to 2019 Scottish National League Division One
Hamilton RFC (11th)
Kirkcaldy RFC (12th)

2021–22 Clubs

These clubs remained the same as the 2019–20 season due to the COVID-19 pandemic.

Past winners
Winners of the third tier competition – includes National League Division Three (1973–1995), Premiership Division Three (1996-2012) and National League Division Two (2015–present)

Kilmarnock RFC (as National League Division Three)
Highland RFC
Haddington
Preston Lodge
Leith Academicals

Haddington
Ayr
Aberdeen GSFP

Musselburgh
Corstorphine
Currie
Langholm RFC
Kirkcaldy
Dundee HSFP
Peebles
Grangemouth Stags
Haddington
Gordonians RFC
Ayr
Glasgow Academicals (as Premiership Division Three)
Kirkcaldy
Selkirk
Peebles
Edinburgh Academicals
Murrayfield Wanderers

Dundee HSFP
Edinburgh Academicals
Cartha Queens Park
Hamilton
Haddington
Gala
Kirkcaldy
Hillhead/Jordanhill
Whitecraigs
Howe of Fife (no promotion)
Championship Leagues A and B
Championship Leagues A and B
Musselburgh (as National League Division Two)
Hamilton
Cartha Queens Park
Kirkcaldy
Biggar

2
4